Djérem  is a department of Adamawa Province in Cameroon.
The department covers an area of 13,283 km and as of 2001 had a total population of 89,382. The capital of the department lies at Tibati.

It is named after the Djérem River.

Subdivisions
The department is divided administratively into arrondissements, communes and in turn into villages.

Ngaoundal 
Tibati

See also
Communes of Cameroon

References

Departments of Cameroon
Adamawa Region